Anna of Pomerania (also known as Anne de Croy et Aerschot, Anna von Croy und Aerschot, Anna von Pommern) (3 October 1590, Barth - 7 July 1660, Stolp) was Duchess-Consort of Croy and Havré, and allodial heiress of the extinct ducal house of Pomerania.

She was youngest daughter of Bogislaw XIII, Duke of Pomerania and Princess Klara of Brunswick-Lüneburg. She was the last surviving member of the Griffins (Greifen).

In 1619 she married Ernst von Croÿ (1588–1620), prince and duke of Croÿ (1583–1620), an imperial general, he would however die the following year. Ernst was the son of Charles Philippe de Croÿ (1549–1613), who was the only son of Philippe II of Croÿ by his second wife, Anna of Lorraine.

Their son, Ernst Bogislaw von Croy (1620–1684), became the last Lutheran bishop of Kammin (now Kamień Pomorski).

See also
House of Croÿ for short biographies of both Ernsts von Croy

External links
 Anna, Prinzessin von Pommern-Stettin, Herzogin von Croy-Havré

1590 births
1660 deaths
People from Barth, Germany
Pomeranian nobility
People from the Duchy of Pomerania